The C&C 50 is a Canadian sailboat, that was designed by C&C Design and first built in 1972.

Production
The design was built by C&C Yachts in Canada between 1972 and 1975, but it is now out of production.

Design
The C&C 50 is a small recreational keelboat, built predominantly of fibreglass, with wood trim. It has a  masthead sloop rig, an internally-mounted spade-type rudder and a fixed fin keel. It displaces  and carries  of ballast.

The design has a PHRF racing average handicap of 51 with a high of 33 and low of 72.

See also
List of sailing boat types

Similar sailboats
Hunter 49
Hunter HC 50
Marlow-Hunter 47
Marlow-Hunter 50
Marlow-Hunter 50 Center Cockpit

References

Keelboats
1970s sailboat type designs
Sailing yachts
Sailboat type designs by C&C Design
Sailboat types built by C&C Yachts